PURA syndrome, also known as PURA-related neurodevelopmental disorder, is a rare novel genetic disorder which is characterized by developmental and speech delay, neo-natal hypotonia, failure to thrive, excessive sleepiness, epilepsy, and other anomalies.

Description 

Patients (usually children, but including adults) with this disorder usually show:

 Widespread developmental delay
 Speech delay
 Balance and walking difficulties (may learn to walk at a later-than-average age or may never be ambulatory)
 Hypotonia
 Feeding difficulties (dysphagia is one of the causes)
 Epilepsy
 Excessive daytime sleepiness
 Chronic hypothermia
 Apnea
 Hypoventilation
 Kyphosis and Scoliosis
 Visual disturbances including Strabismus and Nystagmus

Breathing problems often resolve after the age of one.

Causes 

This disorder is caused by mutations in the PURA gene, in chromosome 5. This gene is essential for the formation of pur-alpha, a protein which controls the activity of various genes and is vital for the replication of genes. It is also important for the normal development of the brain by directing the growth and division of neurons, the formation and maturation of myelin, which is a substance that protects nerves and promotes efficient nerve impulse transmission. These mutations are often spontaneous (de novo), which means that they may appear in a baby whose family history is clear of the mutation. It has been shown that the mutations would be inherited in an autosomal dominant fashion.

Etimology 

This condition was first discovered in 2014 by Lalani et al. when they described 11 individuals with neonatal-onset hypotonia, encephalopathy which was often (but not always) associated with epilepsy, and severe developmental delay.

Epidemiology 
According to OMIM, around 62 cases have been described in medical literature worldwide, making PURA syndrome a very rare disorder. It is estimated that this syndrome is the cause of 1% of all cases of developmental delay.

As would be expected with a disease this rare, patients who were undiagnosed (or misdiagnosed with other disorders, such as the similar-appearing Angelmans Syndrome) are being discovered. As of 2023, PURA Syndrome Foundation has recognized over 500 patients worldwide.

References 

Genetics